Between 9 October 2013 and 30 September 2017, the Parliament of Norway consisted of 169 members from 8 parties and 19 constituencies, elected during the 2013 Norwegian parliamentary election on 8 and 9 September. The center-right block received a majority of the seats, with the two largest right-wing parties, the Conservative Party (48 members) and the Progress Party (29 members) forming the minority Solberg's Cabinet. The cabinet had parliamentary support from the Christian Democratic Party (10 members) and the Liberal Party (9 members). The opposition consisted of the Labour Party (55 members), the Centre Party (10 members), the Socialist Left Party (7 members) and the Green Party (1 member).

Members of the Parliament of Norway are elected based on party-list proportional representation in plural member constituencies. The representatives from different political parties were elected from 19 constituencies, which are identical to the 19 counties. The electorate did not vote for individuals but rather for party lists, with a ranked list of candidates nominated by the party. This means that the person on top of the list would get the seat unless the voter alters the ballot. Parties could nominate candidates from outside their own constituency, and even Norwegian citizens currently living abroad.

The Sainte-Laguë method was used for allocating parliamentary seats to parties. As a result, the percentage of representatives was roughly equal to the nationwide percentage of votes. Conversely, if a party's initial representation in Parliament was proportionally less than its share of votes, the party might seat more representatives through leveling seats, provided that the nationwide percentage is above the election threshold, at 4 percent. Since 2005, nineteen seats in each parliament have been allocated via the leveling system.

If a representative was absent for whatever reason, his or her seat were filled by a candidate from the same party-list—in other words, there are no by-elections. Representatives who died during the term were replaced permanently, whereas representatives who were appointed to a government position, such as government minister (cabinet member) or state secretary, were replaced by a deputy representative until the representative no longer holds the government position. Deputy representatives also meet during typically short-term absence, like when a representative travels abroad with a parliamentary work group or is absent for health reasons.

By county and party
The following is a breakdown of the intersection of parties and constituencies.

Representatives
The following is a list of members elected to the parliament in the 2013 election. It consists of the representative's name, party, and constituency, in addition to noting members assigned to government and deceased, with their regular deputy, chair and deputy chairs of standing committees, parliamentary leaders of the parties and representatives elected through a leveling seat.

When the Solberg's Cabinet was announced, nine representatives were given ministerial positions and a tenth representative is a state secretary. Deputies took their seats while the elected members are serving in the cabinet.

References
Repr. prognose Ministry of Local Government and Regional Development